Club Social Deportivo Leoncio Prado (sometimes referred as Leoncio Prado) is a Peruvian football club, playing in the city of Pampas de Hospital, Tumbes, Peru.

History
The Club Social Deportivo Leoncio Prado was founded on May 30, 1956.

In 1980 Copa Perú, the club classified to the Regional Stage, but was eliminated by Los Aguerridos de Monsefú and Sport Bellavista.

Honours

Regional
Liga Departamental de Tumbes:
Winners (2): 1979, 1991
Runner-up (1): 2022

Liga Provincial de Zarumilla:
Winners (1): 2022

Liga Distrital de Pampas de Hospital:
Winners (2): 1973, 2019

See also
List of football clubs in Peru
Peruvian football league system

References

External links
 

Football clubs in Peru
Association football clubs established in 1956
1956 establishments in Peru